= Fahmideh Square (Shiraz) =

Coordinates: 29.5968°N 52.5329°E

Fahmideh Square is a square in the southern part of Shiraz, Iran where Artesh Boulevard meets Ahmadi Street and Sarv Street. It goes to Shahzadeh Qasem Intersection in the north, Artesh Square in the west and 12 Farvardin Square in the east.

== Transportation ==
=== Streets ===
- Artesh Boulevard
- Ahmadi Street
- Sarv Street

=== Buses ===
- Route 5
- Route 25
- Route 75
